The Associated Press National Football League Coach of the Year Award is presented annually by the Associated Press (AP) to the National Football League (NFL) coach adjudged to have had the most outstanding season. It has been awarded since the 1957 season. Since 2011, the winner has been announced at the annual NFL Honors ceremony.

Don Shula has won the most AP NFL Coach of the Year awards, receiving four during his 33-year head coaching career: three with the Baltimore Colts and one with the Miami Dolphins. Chuck Knox and Bill Belichick have each been awarded three times.

Winners

See also
 National Football League Coach of the Year Award for NFL coach of the year awards by other organizations

Notes

References
General
 
 

Footnotes

National Football League trophies and awards
National Football League coaches
Coaching awards